Currently there are 28 natural gas fields in Bangladesh. The first gas field was discovered at Haripur, Sylhet in 1955 and the last gas field was discovered in the 2017 at Bhola. Titas gas field is the largest natural gas field in Bangladesh. It was invented by the Pakistan Shell Oil Company in Brahmanbaria in the year 1962. The first gas transmission was started in 1957.

List

See also 
 List of countries by natural gas production
 List of natural gas fields

References 

Natural gas fields in Bangladesh
Natural gas